"Sitting Down Here" is a song written by Norwegian singer-songwriter Lene Marlin for Marlin's 1999 debut album, Playing My Game. The song is the album's opening track and was released as its second single in February 1999, peaking at number two on the Norwegian Singles Chart. It also peaked within the top 10 in Finland, Hungary, Italy, the Netherlands, New Zealand, and the United Kingdom. The song is certified gold in Norway and the United Kingdom.

Release and composition
The song was very successful in many countries, reaching number two in Norway, number three in Italy, number four in Finland, New Zealand and Scotland, and number five in the Netherlands and the UK. The song also peaked at number six in Hungary and Ireland, number 12 in Denmark, and number 18 in Sweden. "Sitting Down Here" is composed in common time and has the standard verse-chorus form. Its instrumentation comes mainly from the guitar.

Critical reception
Can't Stop the Pop stated that Marlin's "ability to craft a track with so many layers and shades of grey was impressive and Sitting Down Here was the perfect showcase of that, at the very least." Håkon Moslet from Norwegian newspaper Dagbladet noted the song as "smooth [and] radio-friendly" in his review of Playing My Game. Geir Rakvaag from Dagsavisen wrote that the song, with "Unforgivable Sinner" and "Where I'm Headed" are the "most earcatching" songs of the album. Terje Carlsen from Fredrikstad Blad said it is "immaculate". Pia M. Isaksen from Moss Dagblad was less enthustiastic, calling it "traditional folk" with a "nice" melody. Kjell Nordeng from Nordlands Framtid wrote in his review, that "Sitting Down Here" and "Unforgivable Sinner" are the "cream of the crop" of the album. Pop Rescue noted the song as a "gentle acoustic guitar meandering", adding that "this song is catchy, it feels summery and light. The guitars are delicate, and the bass line gently prods it along."

Track listings

 Norwegian CD single (1999)
 "Sitting Down Here" – 3:55
 "The Way We Are" (live acoustic version) – 4:50

 European CD single (1999)
 "Sitting Down Here" – 3:55
 "Playing My Game (acoustic version) – 3:27

 Australian CD single (1999)
 "Sitting Down Here" – 3:55
 "Playing My Game (acoustic version) – 3:27
 "I Know" – 2:23

 UK CD single (2000)
 "Sitting Down Here" (original version) – 3:55
 "Sitting Down Here" (Tin Tin Out Mix) – 3:53
 "Playing My Game (acoustic version) – 3:27
 "Sitting Down Here" (video) – 3:55

 UK cassette single (2000)
 "Sitting Down Here" (original version) 
 "Sitting Down Here" (Tin Tin Out mix) 
 "Playing My Game" (acoustic version)

Credits and personnel
 
 
Lead vocals: Lene Marlin
Producers: Hans G, Jorn Dahl
Audio mixing: Richard Lowe

Guitar: Bernt Rune Stray
 Drums, programming: Jorn Dahl
Audio mixing assistant: Dab Bierton

Charts

Weekly charts

Year-end charts

Certifications

Release history

References

External links
 Lene Marlin's Official Website

1999 singles
1999 songs
Lene Marlin songs
Virgin Records singles